The following is a list of current bus loops and transit exchanges in Metro Vancouver.

Exchanges

Notes

References

External links
 TransLink Bus Loop and Exchange Maps

TransLink (British Columbia)
Transit exchanges
Transit